Memorialul Durerii (The Memorial of Suffering) is a Romanian Television documentary series about persecution, the labor camp system, anti-communist resistance and the secret police in Communist Romania. It started airing in 1991.

One of the most memorable interviews on the show  was the one conducted in 1992 with Elisabeta Rizea, who joined an anti-Communist guerrilla group in the early 1950s, and then spent 12 years in prison, being subjected to torture.

References

Legături externe 

 Memorialul durerii pe Visit-ro.com

Romanian television series
Historical television series
1991 Romanian television series debuts
1990s Romanian television series
TVR (TV network) original programming